In mathematics, Legendre polynomials, named after Adrien-Marie Legendre (1782), are a system of complete and orthogonal polynomials with a vast number of mathematical properties and numerous applications. They can be defined in many ways, and the various definitions highlight different aspects as well as suggest generalizations and connections to different mathematical structures and physical and numerical applications.

Closely related to the Legendre polynomials are associated Legendre polynomials, Legendre functions, Legendre functions of the second kind, and associated Legendre functions.

Definition by construction as an orthogonal system 
In this approach, the polynomials are defined as an orthogonal system with respect to the weight function  over the interval . That is,  is a polynomial of degree , such that

With the additional standardization condition , all the polynomials can be uniquely determined. With work, all the coefficients of every polynomial can be systematically determined, leading to the explicit representation in powers of  given below.

This definition of the 's is the simplest one. It does not appeal to the theory of differential equations. Second, the completeness of the polynomials follows immediately from the completeness of the powers 1, . Finally, by defining them via orthogonality with respect to the most obvious weight function on a finite interval, it sets up the Legendre polynomials as one of the three classical orthogonal polynomial systems. The other two are the Laguerre polynomials, which are orthogonal over the half line , and the Hermite polynomials, orthogonal over the full line , with weight functions that are the most natural analytic functions that ensure convergence of all integrals.

Definition via generating function 

Expanding up to  gives

Expansion to higher orders gets increasingly cumbersome, but is possible to do systematically, and again leads to one of the explicit forms given below.

It is possible to obtain the higher 's without resorting to direct expansion of the Taylor series, however.

The generating function approach is directly connected to the multipole expansion in electrostatics, as explained below, and is how the polynomials were first defined by Legendre in 1782.

Definition via differential equation 
A third definition is in terms of solutions to Legendre's differential equation:

The orthogonality and completeness of these solutions is best seen from the viewpoint of Sturm–Liouville theory. We rewrite the differential equation as an eigenvalue problem,

If we demand that the solution be regular at
, the differential operator on the left is Hermitian. The eigenvalues are found to be of the form 
The orthogonality and completeness of this set of solutions follows at once from the larger framework of Sturm–Liouville theory.

The differential equation admits another, non-polynomial solution, the Legendre functions of the second kind .
A two-parameter generalization of (Eq. ) is called Legendre's general differential equation, solved by the Associated Legendre polynomials. Legendre functions are solutions of Legendre's differential equation (generalized or not) with non-integer parameters.

In physical settings, Legendre's differential equation arises naturally whenever one solves Laplace's equation (and related partial differential equations) by separation of variables in spherical coordinates. From this standpoint, the eigenfunctions of the angular part of the Laplacian operator are the spherical harmonics, of which the Legendre polynomials are (up to a multiplicative constant) the subset that is left invariant by rotations about the polar axis. The polynomials appear as  where  is the polar angle. This approach to the Legendre polynomials provides a deep connection to rotational symmetry. Many of their properties which are found laboriously through the methods of analysis — for example the addition theorem — are more easily found using the methods of symmetry and group theory, and acquire profound physical and geometrical meaning.

Orthogonality and completeness 

The standardization  fixes the normalization of the Legendre polynomials (with respect to the  norm on the interval ). Since they are also orthogonal with respect to the same norm, the two statements can be combined into the single equation,

(where  denotes the Kronecker delta, equal to 1 if  and to 0 otherwise).
This normalization is most readily found by employing Rodrigues' formula, given below.

That the polynomials are complete means the following. Given any piecewise continuous function  with finitely many discontinuities in the interval , the sequence of sums

This completeness property underlies all the expansions discussed in this article, and is often stated in the form

Rodrigues' formula and other explicit formulas 
An especially compact expression for the Legendre polynomials is given by Rodrigues' formula:

This formula enables derivation of a large number of properties of the 's. Among these are explicit representations such as

In the third representation,  ⌊n/2⌋ stands for the largest integer less than or equal to n/2. The last representation, which is also immediate from the recursion formula, expresses the Legendre polynomials by simple monomials and involves the generalized form of the binomial coefficient.

The first few Legendre polynomials are:

The graphs of these polynomials (up to ) are shown below:

Applications of Legendre polynomials

Expanding a 1/r potential

The Legendre polynomials were first introduced in 1782 by Adrien-Marie Legendre as the coefficients in the expansion of the Newtonian potential

The series converges when . The expression gives the gravitational potential associated to a point mass or the Coulomb potential associated to a point charge. The expansion using Legendre polynomials might be useful, for instance, when integrating this expression over a continuous mass or charge distribution.

Legendre polynomials occur in the solution of Laplace's equation of the static potential, in a charge-free region of space, using the method of separation of variables, where the boundary conditions have axial symmetry (no dependence on an azimuthal angle).

They also appear when solving the Schrödinger equation in three dimensions for a central force.

Legendre polynomials in multipole expansions 

Legendre polynomials are also useful in expanding functions of the form (this is the same as before, written a little differently):

which arise naturally in multipole expansions.  The left-hand side of the equation is the generating function for the Legendre polynomials.

This expansion is used to develop the normal multipole expansion.

This expansion is the basis of interior multipole expansion.

Legendre polynomials in trigonometry  

The trigonometric functions , also denoted as the Chebyshev polynomials , can also be multipole expanded by the Legendre polynomials . The first several orders are as follows:

Legendre polynomials in recurrent neural networks 

A recurrent neural network that contains a -dimensional memory vector, can be optimized such that its neural activities obey the linear time-invariant system given by the following state-space representation:

When combined with deep learning methods, these networks can be trained to outperform long short-term memory units and related architectures, while using fewer computational resources.

Additional properties of Legendre polynomials 
Legendre polynomials have definite parity. That is, they are even or odd, according to

Another useful property is

It is convenient when a Legendre series  is used to approximate a function or experimental data: the average of the series over the interval  is simply given by the leading expansion coefficient .

Since the differential equation and the orthogonality property are independent of scaling, the Legendre polynomials' definitions are "standardized" (sometimes called "normalization", but the actual norm is not 1) by being scaled so that

The derivative at the end point is given by

The Askey–Gasper inequality for Legendre polynomials reads

The Legendre polynomials of a scalar product of unit vectors can be expanded with spherical harmonics using

Recurrence relations
As discussed above, the Legendre polynomials obey the three-term recurrence relation known as Bonnet's recursion formula given by

and

or, with the alternative expression, which also holds at the endpoints

Useful for the integration of Legendre polynomials is

From the above one can see also that

or equivalently

where  is the norm over the interval

Asymptotics

and for arguments of magnitude greater than 1

Zeros 
This is known as the interlacing property. These zeros play an important role in numerical integration based on Gaussian quadrature. The specific quadrature based on the 's is known as Gauss-Legendre quadrature.

Pointwise evaluations
The parity and normalization implicate the values at the boundaries  to be 

At the origin  one can show that the values are given by

Legendre polynomials with transformed argument

Shifted Legendre polynomials 

The shifted Legendre polynomials are defined as

Here the "shifting" function  is an affine transformation that bijectively maps the interval  to the interval , implying that the polynomials  are orthogonal on :

An explicit expression for the shifted Legendre polynomials is given by

The analogue of Rodrigues' formula for the shifted Legendre polynomials is

The first few shifted Legendre polynomials are:

Legendre rational functions 

The Legendre rational functions are a sequence of orthogonal functions on [0, ∞). They are obtained by composing the Cayley transform with Legendre polynomials.

A rational Legendre function of degree n is defined as:

They are eigenfunctions of the singular Sturm–Liouville problem:

with eigenvalues

See also

 Gaussian quadrature
 Gegenbauer polynomials
 Turán's inequalities
 Legendre wavelet
 Jacobi polynomials
 Romanovski polynomials
 Laplace expansion (potential)

Notes

References

External links

A quick informal derivation of the Legendre polynomial in the context of the quantum mechanics of hydrogen

Wolfram MathWorld entry on Legendre polynomials
Dr James B. Calvert's article on Legendre polynomials from his personal collection of mathematics
The Legendre Polynomials by Carlyle E. Moore
Legendre Polynomials from Hyperphysics

Special hypergeometric functions
Orthogonal polynomials
Polynomials